In mathematics, a hierarchy is a set-theoretical object, consisting of a preorder defined on a set. This is often referred to as an ordered set, though that is an ambiguous term that many authors reserve for partially ordered sets or totally ordered sets. The term pre-ordered set is unambiguous, and is always synonymous with a mathematical hierarchy. The term hierarchy is used to stress a hierarchical relation among the elements.

Sometimes, a set comes equipped with a natural hierarchical structure. For example, the set of natural numbers N is equipped with a natural pre-order structure, where  whenever we can find some other number  so that . This idea can be applied to any commutative monoid. On the other hand, the set of integers Z requires a more sophisticated argument for its hierarchical structure, since we can always solve the equation  by writing .

A mathematical hierarchy (a pre-ordered set) should not be confused with the more general concept of a hierarchy in the social realm, particularly when one is constructing computational models that are used to describe real-world social, economic or political systems. These hierarchies, or complex networks, are much too rich to be described in the category Set of sets. This is not just a pedantic claim; there are also mathematical hierarchies, in the general sense, that are not describable using set theory.

Other natural hierarchies arise in computer science, where the word refers to partially ordered sets whose elements are classes of objects of increasing complexity. In that case, the preorder defining the hierarchy is the class-containment relation. Containment hierarchies are thus special cases of hierarchies.

Related terminology
Individual elements of a hierarchy are often called levels and a hierarchy is said to be infinite if it has infinitely many distinct levels but said to collapse if it has only finitely many distinct levels.

Example
In theoretical computer science, the time hierarchy is a classification of decision problems according to the amount of time required to solve them.

See also

Order theory
Nested set
Tree structure
Lattice
Polynomial hierarchy
Chomsky hierarchy
Analytical hierarchy
Arithmetical hierarchy
Hyperarithmetical hierarchy
 Abstract algebraic hierarchy
Borel hierarchy
Wadge hierarchy
Difference hierarchy
 Tree (data structure)
 Tree (graph theory)
 Tree network
 Tree (descriptive set theory)
 Tree (set theory)

References 

Hierarchy
Set theory